Kerslake is a surname. Notable people with the surname include:

Bob Kerslake (born 1955), former Head of the Home Civil Service in UK
Camilla Kerslake (born 1988), English classical crossover singer from London
David Kerslake (born 1966), English former professional footballer
Doug Kerslake (1950–2015), retired Canadian professional ice hockey player
Ken Kerslake (1930–2007), American artist and printmaker
Kevin Kerslake, American music video director
Lee Kerslake (1947–2020), English musician with the rock band Uriah Heep
Phil Kerslake (born 1959), Welsh-born New Zealand leadership coach, speaker, author and TV presenter
Roy Kerslake (born 1942), British cricketer from Devon
Seána Kerslake (born 1990), Irish actress from Tallaght
Simon Kerslake, fictional character in the political novel First Among Equals by Jeffrey Archer
Thomas Kerslake (1812–1891), English bookseller and antiquarian
William Kerslake, American Olympic heavy weight wrestler and retired NASA engineer

See also
Kerslake Hall, residential college for full-time students of the University of Tasmania and Australian Maritime College

de:Kerslake